Melissa James Gibson is a Canadian-born playwright based in New York.

Life
The child of former BC Liberal MLA Gordon Gibson and journalist Valerie Gibson, Melissa James Gibson grew up in North Vancouver. She graduated from Columbia University and from the Yale School of Drama with an M.F.A. in Playwriting. After graduating, she worked as a college counselor at the exclusive arts-oriented Saint Ann's School in Brooklyn Heights, where her daughter, Celia Frey, graduated in 2017 and her son, Griffin Frey, is a current sophomore.  She is working on commissions for the La Jolla Playhouse and The Adirondack Theatre Festival. She has received fellowships from the Jerome Foundation and the MacDowell Colony.
The New York Times theatre critic Charles Isherwood wrote that, with her play This, Gibson “graduates into the theatrical big leagues with this beautifully conceived, confidently executed and wholly accessible work.”

She subsequently wrote episodes for The Americans and House of Cards, before joining Endeavor Content in an overall deal.

Awards
 2002 Obie for playwriting, Kesselring Prize, The Best Plays of 2001–02 for [sic] 
 2002 Whiting Award
 2011 Steinberg Playwright Award

Works
 God's Paws (1993).
 Six Fugues (1995).
 [sic], Steppenwolf Theatre Company commission, New York Premiere: Soho Rep (2001).
 Suitcase, or Those That Resemble Flies From A Distance (NEA/ TCG Theatre Residency Program), Soho Rep (2004).
 Brooklyn Bridge, music by Barbara Brousal (The Children's Theater Company/New Dramatists Playground program commission) (2005).
 Current Nobody, Woolly Mammoth Theatre Company, DC, (2007).
 Nuda Veritas, Philadelphia Fringe Festival (2009).
 This, Playwrights Horizons, (2009). Canadian Premiere: Vancouver Playhouse, January 2011, directed by Amiel Gladstone.
 What Rhymes With America, Atlantic Theater Company (2012).
 Various episodes for the TV series The Americans (2013-2014).
 Placebo, Playwrights Horizons (2015).
 Given Fish (Steppenwolf Theatre Company commission, grants from the New York State Council on the Arts and the Greenwall Foundation)

References

External links
"Melissa James Gibson", ''doollee'
"Interview with Melissa James Gibson", Playwrights Foundation, November 11, 2008
"Melissa James Gibson: Lady of the Flies", The New York Observer, John Heilpern, February 8, 2004

Living people
Year of birth missing (living people)
American dramatists and playwrights
Columbia University alumni
Yale School of Drama alumni
Place of birth missing (living people)
Obie Award recipients